In linguistics, a pro-verb is a verb or partial phrase that substitutes for a contextually recognizable verb phrase (via a process known as grammatical gapping), obviating the need to repeat an antecedent verb phrase. A pro-verb is a type of anaphora that falls within the general group of word classes called pro-forms.

In English
English does not have dedicated pro-verbs; however, a bare infinitive can generally be implied rather than expressed. Catenative verbs that take bare infinitives can be said to double as pro-verbs by implying rather than expressing them (including most of the auxiliary verbs). Similarly, the auxiliary verbs have and be can double as pro-verbs for perfect, progressive, and passive constructions by eliding the participle. When there is no other auxiliary or catenative verb, do can be used as with do-support unless the antecedent verb is to be. 

The following are some examples of these kinds of pro-verb:

Who can tell? —No one can .
Why can't he do it? —He can ; he just won't .
I like pie, as does he .
Why did you break the jar? —He made me .
Can you go to the park? No, I cannot [go to the park].
Note that, when there are multiple auxiliary verbs, some of these may be elided as well. For example, in reply to "Who's been leaving the milk out of the refrigerator?", any of "You've been doing it", "You have been", or "You have" would have the same meaning.

Since a to-infinitive is just the particle to plus a bare infinitive, and a bare infinitive can be elided, the particle to doubles as a pro-verb for a to-infinitive:Clean your room! —I don't want to .He refused to clean his room when I told him to .Finally, even in dialects where bare infinitives and participles can be elided, there does exist the pro-verb do so: "He asked me to leave, so I did so". This pro-verb, unlike the above-described pro-verbs, can be used in any grammatical context; however, in contexts where another pro-verb could be used, it can be overly formal. For example, in "I want to get an 'A', but to do so, I need to get a perfect score on the next test," there is no other pro-verb that could be used; whereas in "I want to get an 'A', but I can't do so," the do so'' could simply be elided, and doing so would make the sentence sound less formal.

References

Parts of speech